News 13 (also officially known as Spectrum News 13 as of September 24, 2017) is an American cable news television channel owned by Charter Communications. The channel provides 24-hour rolling news coverage focused primarily on Central Florida, specifically Brevard, Flagler, Lake, Marion, Orange, Osceola, Seminole, Sumter, and Volusia counties.

History
The channel originally launched in October 29, 1997 as Central Florida News 13; it was originally partnered with the Orlando Sentinel to help with 24-hour newsgathering operations and the channel was originally operated by Time Warner Cable, which relinquished cable television franchise rights in the Orlando metropolitan area to Bright House Networks in 2001. On December 14, 2010, the channel was added to Bright House's system in the Tampa Bay area, on digital channel 1213; the channel is offered in addition to the provider's local news channel in the area, Bay News 9.

On November 1, 2011, Central Florida News 13 launched a high definition simulcast feed and began airing its newscasts in the format. As part of the upgrade, the channel installed a new master control system and unveiled a slightly modified graphics package.

The channel unveiled a major branding overhaul on August 27, 2013, the most significant in the channel's history. It shortened its name from "Central Florida News 13" to simply News 13 (its website domain was accordingly changed cfnews13.com to mynews13.com); the channel also adopted a logo based on that used by its sister channel in the Tampa Bay region known as Bay News 9 and introduced a new news music ("Primetime News" by Non-Stop Music, which has been used by Bay News 9 since its September 1997 launch) and graphics package, the latter of which is designed to fit 16:9 television sets. Its longtime slogan "All Local, All The Time." was also dropped in favor of the concise "News. Weather. Now.". The logo has been designed by the network's in-house team. The network had expanded away with its newscasts with original programming. Also that day, they launched News 13 24/7, but with the name change, it kept the News 13 branding, when the network ran that channel.

On April 1, 2015, Charter Communications announced that it would be acquiring Bright House Networks, alongside its merger with Time Warner Cable. The acquisition, which was valued at around $71 billion, was completed on May 18, 2016. To reflect this change in ownership, News 13 underwent another name change, going from "News 13" to Spectrum News 13.

On June 12, 2016, during the Orlando nightclub shooting, News 13 received a call from the perpetrator, Omar Mateen. He told News 13 at 2:45 a.m., "I'm the shooter. It's me. I am the shooter." He then said he was carrying out the shooting on behalf of ISIL and began speaking rapidly in Arabic. Mateen also said the shooting was "triggered" by a U.S.-led bombing strike in Iraq that killed Abu Wahib, an ISIL military commander, on May 6, 2016.

On February 22, 2023, News 13 journalist Dylan Lyons and photographer Jesse Walden were shot in a Pine Hills, Florida neighborhood while covering the scene of a fatal shooting that had killed a woman earlier the same day after the suspected shooter returned to the scene of the crime. Lyons died from his injuries, while Walden was hospitalized in critical condition. The suspected shooter, 19-year-old Keith Melvin Moses, who had an extensive criminal history, also fatally shot a 9-year-old girl and injured her mother shortly after attacking the news crew.

Programming

News 13 carries weather forecast segments in ten-minute intervals, under the brand "Weather on the Ones" (which is also used by the sister regional news channels of Charter Spectrum). During the Atlantic hurricane season, News 13 provides tropical weather updates twice each hour. It also airs regular traffic reports that immediately follow the weather segments, called "Real Time Traffic", each weekdays between 5:00 a.m. and 6:00 p.m. News 13 also provides coverage of the rocket launches occurring at the Kennedy Space Center and Cape Canaveral Space Force Station. News 13 is also an affiliate of the national and international video news service CNN Newsource.

Notable personalities

Notable current personalities
 Dick Batchelor – political analyst
 Lou Frey – political analyst

Notable former personalities
 Vinnie Politan – anchor/reporter; now at Court TV
 Jessica Yellin – anchor/reporter; now national political correspondent at CNN

Affiliated channels

Central Florida News 13 en Español

On March 11, 2011, Bright House Networks announced that it would merge Central Florida News 13 and Bay News 9's respective Spanish-language news channels into a single regional channel, InfoMás. The regional network was launched on July 12, 2011.

See also
 Bay News 9 – a similar regional news channel owned by Charter Communications that serves the Tampa Bay area
 Spectrum Sports (Florida) – co-owned regional sports network serving Central Florida
 WSNN-LD – a similar regional news channel owned by Comcast that serves the Sarasota area

References

External links
www.mynews13.com - News 13 official website

1997 establishments in Florida
24-hour television news channels in the United States
Advance Publications
Charter Communications
English-language television stations in the United States
Television channels and stations established in 1997
Television stations in Florida